Clay County is a county located in the U.S. state of Arkansas. Originally incorporated as Clayton County, as of the 2020 census, its population was 14,552. The county has two county seats, Corning and Piggott. It is a dry county, in which the sale of alcoholic beverages is restricted or prohibited.

History
When Clay County was created as Arkansas's 67th county on March 24, 1873 (along with Baxter County), it was named Clayton County, after John M. Clayton, then a member of the Arkansas Senate and a brother of then-U.S. Senator Powell Clayton, though some sources suggest it may have been named for Powell Clayton instead.

Two years later on December 6, 1875, the county's name was shortened to "Clay" by the Arkansas General Assembly. Some claim it was renamed for the statesman Henry Clay, while others say John M. Clayton remained its official namesake. The name change apparently was inspired by lingering distrust of Powell Clayton, as he had declared martial law and suspended elections in the county in 1868 when he was Governor of Arkansas and it was still part of Greene County.

The first county seat was Corning, established in 1873, with the arrival of the St. Louis, Iron Mountain and Southern Railway, as the first incorporated town in the county. The county seat was moved to Boydsville in 1877, in what was known as “Old Bradshaw Field”, because people living east of the Black and Cache Rivers had difficulty getting to Corning during the flood season. However, this caused problems for those living west of the rivers, and in 1881 Corning was re-established as the seat of the Western District, with Boydsville remaining the seat for the Eastern District. With the arrival of the St. Louis, Arkansas and Texas Railroad in 1882, other towns such as Greenway, Rector and Piggott experienced growth. In 1887, the Eastern District seat was moved to Piggott, and the dual county seat system remains in place today. Important county functions (such as the Quorum Court) alternate between Piggott and Corning as their venues.

In the early 20th century, Clay, Greene, and Craighead counties had sundown town policies forbidding African Americans from living in the area.

On April 6, 1972, Sheriff Douglas Batey and deputies Glen Ray Archer and Troy Key were shot and killed while trying to serve a warrant on Bert Grissom. Grissom opened fire as soon as the men stepped out of their car. He later surrendered without resistance to another deputy, and was tried, convicted, and sentenced to life in prison. William Thomas Pond became sheriff, but he died in an automobile accident on June 8, 1973. Four of the five police officers who have lost their lives serving the Clay County Sheriff's Office died in these two incidents.

Geography

Major highways
 Future Interstate 57
U.S. Highway 49
U.S. Highway 62
U.S. Highway 67
 Highway 90
 Highway 119
 Highway 139

Adjacent counties
 Butler County, Missouri (north)
 Dunklin County, Missouri (east)
 Greene County (south)
 Randolph County (west)
 Ripley County, Missouri (northwest)

Demographics

2020 census

As of the 2020 United States census, there were 14,552 people, 6,444 households, and 4,140 families residing in the county.

2000 census
As of the 2000 census, there were 17,609 people, 7,417 households, and 5,073 families residing in the county.  The population density was 28 people per square mile (11/km2).  There were 8,498 housing units at an average density of 13 per square mile (5/km2).  The racial makeup of the county was 98.1% White, 0.2% Black or African American, 0.7% Native American, 0.1% Asian, 0.2% from other races, and 0.1% from two or more races.  0.8% of the population were Hispanic or Latino of any race.

There were 7,417 households, out of which 28.3% had children under the age of 18 living with them, 56.6% were married couples living together, 8.6% had a female householder with no husband present, and 31.6% were non-families. 28.4% of all households were made up of individuals, and 16.7% had someone living alone who was 65 years of age or older.  The average household size was 2.35 and the average family size was 2.87.

In the county, the population was spread out, with 23.1% under the age of 18, 7.7% from 18 to 24, 25.3% from 25 to 44, 24.6% from 45 to 64, and 19.4% who were 65 years of age or older.  The median age was 40 years. For every 100 females there were 93.5 males.  For every 100 females age 18 and over, there were 88.3 males.

The median income for a household in the county was $25,345, and the median income for a family was $32,558. Males had a median income of $24,375 versus $17,146 for females. The per capita income for the county was $14,512.  About 13.4% of families and 17.5% of the population were below the poverty line, including 21.2% of those under age 18 and 22.7% of those age 65 or over.

Government

County officials
 County Judge: Mike Patterson
 County Clerk: Pat Poole
 Sheriff & Collector: Terry Miller
 Circuit Clerk: Janet Kilbreath
 County Treasurer: Carolyn Morrisett
 District Judge: David Copelin
 Quorum Court Justices: David Cagle, Greg Ahrendt, Doyne Holifield, Joey Henderson, David Hatcher, Dennis Haynes, Mark Watson, & Burton Eddington, Jeff Douglas.

Politics

Economy
Agriculture is the cornerstone of Clay County's economy. Farmers throughout the county grow a wide variety of crops. Rice is the dominant crop, but significant amounts of cotton, soybeans, corn, hay, and milo are also grown. Industry is limited to a handful of factories located in the cities of Piggott, Corning, and Rector.

Education
Public education of elementary and secondary school students is provided by:
 Corning School District
 Piggott School District
 Rector School District

Communities

Cities

 Corning (county seat)
 Greenway
 Knobel
 Peach Orchard
 Piggott (county seat)
 Pollard
 Rector
 St. Francis

Towns
 Datto
 McDougal
 Nimmons
 Success

Unincorporated community
 Scatterville

Townships

 Bennett-Lemmons (McDougal)
 Bradshaw-Haywood (Greenway)
 Brown-Carpenter (Success)
 Cache-Wilson (Knobel)
 Chalk Bluff-Liddell (part of St. Francis)
 Clark (Peach Orchard)
 Cleveland-North Kilgore (part of Corning)
 East Oak Bluff-Blue Cane (part of Rector)
 Gleghorn-South Kilgore (part of Corning)
 Johnson
 Knob
 Nelson (Datto)
 North St. Francis (part of Piggott)
 Payne-Swain (Nimmons)
 Pollard (Pollard)
 South St. Francis (part of Piggott)
 West Oak Bluff (part of Rector)

See also
 Battle of Chalk Bluff
 List of lakes in Clay County, Arkansas
 National Register of Historic Places listings in Clay County, Arkansas

References

 
1873 establishments in Arkansas
Populated places established in 1873
Sundown towns in Arkansas